Zhurov or Zhuraw is a Russian masculine surname, its feminine counterpart is Zhurova or Zhurawa. It may refer to
Svetlana Zhurova (born 1972), Russian speed skater
Uladzimir Zhuraw (born 1991), Belarusian football player 

Russian-language surnames